The Other Half is an American daytime talk show produced for broadcast syndication by NBC Studios, which aired from 2001 to 2003, mainly on NBC's owned-and-operated stations but syndicated to markets outside those in which NBC owned a station. The show was hosted by Dick Clark, actors Danny Bonaduce and Mario Lopez, and cosmetic surgeon Dr. Jan Adams, who was later replaced by actor Dorian Gregory.

It was intended as a male counterpart to the popular ABC talk show The View and, despite its inability to find an audience, it earned a few Emmy Award nominations.

References

External links
 

2000s American television talk shows
2001 American television series debuts
2003 American television series endings
English-language television shows
First-run syndicated television programs in the United States
Television series by Dick Clark Productions
Television series by Universal Television